Janusz-Korczak-Preis is a literary prize of Hesse.

Winners
 1978 Andreas Mehringer
 1979 Prof. Dr. Boguslaw Halikowski, Szczecin
 1980 Prof. Dr. Shimon Sachs, Tel-Aviv
 1983 Bella Abramowna Dizur, Riga
 1985 Mirjam Akavia, Tel-Aviv
 1986 Igor Newerly, Warschau
 1987 Jüdische Gemeinde Gießen
 1988 Prof. Dr. Józef Bogusz, Krakau
 1988 Leon Harari, Kibbuz Maale Hachamisha
 1988 Dr. Rafael Scharf, London
 1990 Szmuel Gogol, Ramat Gan
 1993 Ks. Arkadiusz Nowak, Piastów
 2008 Itzchak Belfer, Tel-Aviv

Literary awards of Hesse